Daniel Robert Snow  (born 3 December 1978) is a British popular historian and television presenter.

Early life and education
Born in Westminster, London Dan Snow is the youngest son of Peter Snow, BBC television journalist, and Canadian Ann MacMillan, managing editor emerita of CBC's London Bureau; thus he holds dual British-Canadian citizenship. Through his mother, he is the nephew of Canadian historian Margaret MacMillan and also a great-great-grandson of British Prime Minister David Lloyd George.

One of his father's cousins is the Channel 4 news reporter Jon Snow and his paternal great-grandfather was Sir Thomas D'Oyly Snow, a British infantry general during World War I.

Snow was educated in London at Westfield Primary School (now Barnes Primary) and at St Paul's School where he was Captain of School and rowed for its VIII. He then went to Balliol College, Oxford, his father's alma mater, and graduated with first-class honours in Modern History. A keen rower since his secondary school days, he won the U-23 men's division at the 2000 British Indoor Rowing Championships and rowed three times in the Boat Race, winning in 2000 and losing the controversial 2001 Boat Race when club President.

Career
Snow presented his first programme in October 2002 just after graduating from university, co-presenting the BBC's 60th anniversary special on the Battles of El Alamein with his father Peter. The two then collaborated to present an eight-part documentary series called Battlefield Britain, which aired in 2004, and won a BAFTA Craft Award for special effects. The same year, Snow won a Sony award as one of the presenters on the LBC Boat Race coverage.

Snow has presented on many state occasions such as the 200th anniversary celebration of the Battle of Trafalgar, Beating Retreat 2006, the 60th anniversary of the end of World War Two, the 90th anniversary of the Armistice in November 2008, Trooping the Colour and the Lord Mayor's Show. Snow again collaborated with his father to present BBC 2's 20th Century Battlefields and its print edition. The series covers battles all around the world and is presented in similar fashion to the first Battlefield Britain.

In early 2022, Snow was part of the Endurance22 expedition that found Antarctic explorer Sir Ernest Shackleton's lost vessel, Endurance, 107 years after it sank in the Weddell Sea.

Television

Radio
Art in the Trenches, Radio 4
At War with Wellington, Radio 4
Prince of Wales, Radio 4, a look at the history of the office of Prince of Wales and the current occupant

Online 

 Dan Snow’s, History HitNetwork
The Historic Present Pod, Charlie Gordon & Jonah Howe

Books

Awards and honours
Snow was appointed Member of the Order of the British Empire (MBE) in the 2019 Birthday Honours for services to history. In 2019 Snow was awarded a Doctor of Letters (DLitt) honoris causa from Lancaster University. Other awards and honours include:

BAFTA (Visual Effects) for 'Battlefield Britain'
Sony Award (Best Live Coverage) for Boat Race Day
BAFTA Cymru (Best Presenter) for 'Hadrian'
Maritime Media Award for best television, film or radio for 'Empire of the Seas'
2011 History Makers Award (Most Innovative Production) for 'Battle for North America' a 1-hour special on Snow's book 'Death or Victory.' Produced by Snow's production company Ballista
Voice of the Listener & Viewer Special Award 2013

As==Personal life==

On 27 November 2010, Snow married the criminologist and philanthropist Lady Edwina Louise Grosvenor, second daughter of The 6th Duke of Westminster. Their daughter Zia (named after Zia Wernher) was born in 2011 and their son Wolf Robert in 2014; and another daughter Orla, born after Wolf.

On 18 April 2010, Snow and a few friends took three rigid-hulled inflatable boats from Dover to Calais to help people return to Britain, after they had been stranded in France by the air travel disruption after the Icelandic eruption. When they arrived at Calais they were told by the French authorities that they could not return to collect any more people. He did manage to get 25 people back but was unable to return for more.

In August 2011, he chased a group of rioters through Notting Hill in west London before tackling and performing a citizen's arrest on a looter who was fleeing from a shoe shop.

Snow serves as President of the Council for British Archaeology and is a member of the Royal Historical Society. As an atheist and a humanist, he is a Patron of Humanists UK and an Honorary Associate of the National Secular Society. He is also an advocate for political reform, being the Electoral Reform Society's first ambassador. He played a prominent part in the 2011 Alternative Vote referendum in the UK; after he released a viral video, the campaign used a version of it, featuring him, as their final Referendum Broadcast.

In August 2014, Snow was one of 200 public figures who were signatories to a letter to The Guardian expressing their hope that Scotland would vote to remain part of the United Kingdom in September's referendum on that issue. In June 2019, Snow wrote in a Twitter thread  if Brexit happened and if the Scottish National Party won a majority of votes in Scotland, he would "get" why Scottish people would want to have a second referendum, as leaving the European Union could "put up barriers" for Scotland. He was then asked if this meant he now advise Scots to vote for independence, and he replied  "No way. One thing Brexit has taught me is the utter insanity of trying to rip countries apart".

Snow is one of sixteen conveners of More United, which plans to support candidates in parliamentary elections that support their values. The movement was set-up "to stand up for our values of opportunity, tolerance, the environment, democracy, and openness" in Summer 2016.

Snow supports Nottingham Forest F.C.

Snow is an Honorary Captain in the Royal Naval Reserve.

References

External links
 Snow's History Hit Podcast
 
 Dan Snow (official Periscope channel)

1978 births
Alumni of Balliol College, Oxford
English atheists
English humanists
British secularists
English people of Scottish descent
English people of Welsh descent
English television presenters
Living people
Oxford University Boat Club rowers
People educated at St Paul's School, London
People from Westminster
Dan
Members of the Order of the British Empire
Television personalities from London
Royal Naval Reserve personnel